The Osmanischer Lloyd was a German-Language daily newspaper in Ottoman Constantinople which was founded after the Young Turk Revolution in 1908 and existed until 1918. Between 1908 and 1915 the newspaper was published as bilingual outlet, with each issue having two pages containing French articles. From November 1915 onwards, there were two 4-page newspapers, one in German and another in French. The funding was provided by the German companies Krupp and the Deutsche Bank.

History 
During its existence, it had six different chief editors of which E. M. Grunwald who lasted the longest, from November 1908 to March 1914. Grunwald was dismissed following constant criticism by the German ambassador to the Ottoman Empire Hans Freiherr von Wangenheim over the leadership of the newspaper. Notable contributors and staff members included Friedrich Schrader and Max Rudolf Kaufmann. The following editors in chief all were not directing the newspaper to the satisfaction to the German embassy and in 1918, the Osmanischer Lloyd was closed down. During the editorship of Grunwald, the Lloyds subscribers initially rose from 324 to 506 between 1908 and 1911, and then fell again to 349. After the outbreak of World War I, the number of subscribers grew by 140. Aside from subscribers, the newspaper was sold to the public, and this number grew constantly from 836 papers sold in November 1908 to 1555 in July 1914 and during the years of war the newspaper sold up to 6700 newspapers in 1915, 8000 in 1916 and 9885 in 1917. In a report of the chief editor Friedrich Schrader in 1915, the readership amount of the French edition was presented as being competitive, when comparing it to other Ottoman newspapers in French language, as it sold 1800 editions on a daily basis.

Content 
On its first page it published official announcements by the German embassy and articles and opinions concerning the German-Ottoman relations. Ottoman governmental announcements were also published on page one. On page two, there were often published translations of articles from the regional press and news provided by the German diplomatic staff or employees in German companies in the Ottoman provinces. In the French edition there were usually published translations of the German articles. The newspaper was confronted also with a strong opposition by the Ottoman press to German influence, which lead to disputes with other newspapers, each presenting their article as the correct view.

References 

Newspapers published in Istanbul
Newspapers established in 1908
Publications disestablished in 1918
German-language newspapers published in Europe
Defunct newspapers published in the Ottoman Empire
1908 establishments in the Ottoman Empire
Daily newspapers published in Turkey
1918 disestablishments in the Ottoman Empire